Sergey Vladimirovich Ilyushin (– 9 February 1977) was a Soviet aircraft designer who founded the Ilyushin aircraft design bureau. He designed the Il-2 Shturmovik, which made its maiden flight in 1939. It is the most produced warplane, and remains the second most-produced aircraft in history, with some 36,000+ built, behind the US Cessna 172.

Biography

Early years 
Born in the village of Dilyalevo in Russian family, as the youngest of 11 children in a peasant family, the largely self-taught Ilyushin left home at an early age. He worked as a factory laborer, ditch-digger at construction sites, and cleaner of gutters at a dye plant in Petrograd. In 1910, he learned that jobs were available at Kolomyazhsky Racetrack as a groundskeeper. The racetrack was also the site of the first All-Russia Festival of Ballooning in autumn of 1910, and Ilyushin assisted in unpacking crates and setting up equipment. He was also able to meet many of Russia's pioneer aviators, an event that awoke his interest in aviation.

In 1911 he returned to his native village to work as a carter of a dairy plant. The following year, he worked as a construction worker for the Amur Railway, and in 1913 he was in Tallinn as a worker in a shipyard.

With the outbreak of World War I in 1914, Ilyushin was conscripted into the Imperial Russian Army, serving with the infantry, and later (as he was literate) as a clerk in the military administration of Vologda. When a request came for seven volunteers to serve in the fledgling Aviation Section, he was quick to volunteer. He worked at first as a mechanic and member of the ground crew. In the summer of 1917, he was qualified as a pilot.

In March 1918, with the withdrawal of the Provisional Government from the war, Ilyushin was demobilized and sent back to his native village. He helped supervise the increasing nationalization of factories in the area and in October 1918 joined the Bolshevik party. With the Russian Civil War, Ilyushin was drafted into the Red Army in May 1919, working as aviation technician of VVS RKKA (Red Army). That autumn, a White movement Avro 504 biplane made a forced landing near Petrozavodsk. Ilyushin led a team which dismantled it, and sent it to Moscow where it was reverse-engineered into the Soviet U-1 trainer, of which 737 examples were subsequently built.

Work in aviation
In the autumn of 1921 Ilyushin left military service; he entered the Institute of Engineers of the Red Air Fleet (renamed the Zhukovsky Air Force Engineering Academy on 9 September 1922) on 21 September 1921. During his student years he concentrated on the design of gliders, taking part in numerous competitions. In 1925 one of his designs was sent to a competition in Germany, where it took first prize for flight time. This time he was also appointed Assistant Chief of the Air Force Research and Test Institute. Upon his own request in November 1931 he was reassigned to TsAGI Design Bureau and worked there till 1933.

His single-engined Ilyushin Il-2 ground-attack aircraft, the single most-produced combat aircraft design in history (with 36,183 examples), and the Ilyushin Il-4 twin-engined bomber (of which just over 5,200 examples were built) were used extensively in World War II, on all fronts where the Soviets fought.

After the war, Ilyushin concentrated primarily on commercial airliners, such as the Ilyushin Il-18 and Ilyushin Il-62, which saw extensive use with Aeroflot and with numerous Soviet client states. In 1967 he was given the honorary rank of General-Colonel of Engineering/Technical Service. He became an Academician of the Academy of Sciences of the Soviet Union in 1968. He remained the chief designer at the Ilyushin OKB until his retirement due to illness in 1970.

From 1937 to 1970 Ilyushin also served as a deputy of the Supreme Soviet of the Soviet Union. He died in 1977 in Moscow and was buried in the Novodevichy Cemetery.

Awards and honors

 Hero of Socialist Labour (1941, 1957, 1974)
 Stalin Prize (1941, 1942, 1943, 1946, 1947, 1950, 1952)
 USSR State Prize (1971)
 Lenin Prize (1960)
 Order of Lenin (1937, 1941, 1945, twice in 1954, 1964, 1971, 1974)
 Order of Suvorov 1st and the 2nd class (1945, 1944)
 Order of the October Revolution (1969)
 Order of the Red Banner (1944, 1950)
 Order of the Red Banner of Labour (1939)
 Order of the Red Star (1933, 1967)
 International Air & Space Hall of Fame inductee (2006).

See also
His son Vladimir Ilyushin

References

Further reading

Pederson, Jay. International Directory of Company Histories, Vol.24, St James Press (1998) 
Bull, Stephan. Encyclopedia of Military Technology and Innovation, Greenwood (2004) 
Gordon, Yefim. Soviet Air Power in World War II. Midland Publishing (2008) 

1894 births
1977 deaths
20th-century Russian engineers
People from Vologodsky District
People from Vologodsky Uyezd
Central Aerohydrodynamic Institute employees
Communist Party of the Soviet Union members
Full Members of the USSR Academy of Sciences
First convocation members of the Soviet of Nationalities
Second convocation members of the Soviet of Nationalities
Third convocation members of the Soviet of Nationalities
Fourth convocation members of the Soviet of Nationalities
Fifth convocation members of the Soviet of Nationalities
Sixth convocation members of the Soviet of Nationalities
Seventh convocation members of the Soviet of Nationalities
Heroes of Socialist Labour
Stalin Prize winners
Lenin Prize winners
Knights of the Order of Polonia Restituta
Recipients of the Order of Lenin
Recipients of the Order of Suvorov, 1st class
Recipients of the Order of Suvorov, 2nd class
Recipients of the Order of the Red Banner
Recipients of the Order of the Red Banner of Labour
Recipients of the Order of the Red Star
Recipients of the USSR State Prize
Bolsheviks
Ilyushin
Russian aerospace engineers
Russian mechanical engineers
Soviet aerospace engineers
Soviet colonel generals
Soviet mechanical engineers
Burials at Novodevichy Cemetery